Britannia Bay is a small town in the West Coast District Municipality in the Western Cape province of South Africa, approximately  from Cape Town.

The village takes its name from a British East Indiaman ship which was badly damaged by a reef in the bay.   Rediscovered in January 1998, the wreck of the Britannia has been placed under the supervision of the Council for National Monuments.

In June 2020, a well-preserved giant squid washed up on a nearby beach.

References

Populated places in the Saldanha Bay Local Municipality